The Republic of Estonia gained its independence from the Russian Empire on 24 February 1918 and established diplomatic relations with many countries via membership of the League of Nations. The forcible incorporation of Estonia into the Soviet Union in 1940 was not generally recognised by the international community and the Estonian diplomatic service continued to operate in some countries. Following the restoration of independence from the Soviet Union, Russia was one of the first nations to re-recognize Estonia's independence (the first country to do so was Iceland on 22 August 1991). Estonia's immediate priority after regaining its independence was the withdrawal of Russian (formerly Soviet) forces from Estonian territory. In August 1994, this was completed. However, relations with Moscow have remained strained primarily because Russia decided not to ratify the border treaty it had signed with Estonia in 1999.

Trends following re-independence
Since regaining independence, Estonia has pursued a foreign policy of close cooperation with Western European nations.  The two most important policy objectives in this regard have been accession into NATO and the European Union, achieved in March and May 2004 respectively. Estonia's international realignment toward the West has been accompanied by a general deterioration in relations with Russia, most recently demonstrated by the controversy surrounding relocation of the Bronze Soldier WWII memorial in Tallinn. Estonia has become an increasingly strong supporter of deepening European integration. The decision to participate in the preparation of a financial transaction tax in 2012 reflects this shift in Estonia's EU policy.

An important element in Estonia's post-independence reorientation has been closer ties with the Nordic countries, especially Finland and Sweden. Indeed, Estonians consider themselves a Nordic people due to being Finnic people like the Finns rather than Balts, based on their historical ties with Denmark and particularly Finland and Sweden. In December 1999 Estonian foreign minister (and since 2006, president of Estonia) Toomas Hendrik Ilves delivered a speech entitled "Estonia as a Nordic Country" to the Swedish Institute for International Affairs. In 2003, the foreign ministry also hosted an exhibit called "Estonia: Nordic with a Twist". And in 2005, Estonia joined the European Union's Nordic Battle Group. It has also shown continued interest in becoming a full member in the Nordic Council.

Whereas in 1992 Russia accounted for 92% of Estonia's international trade, today there is extensive economic interdependence between Estonia and its Nordic neighbors: three-quarters of foreign investment in Estonia originates in the Nordic countries (principally Finland and Sweden), to which Estonia sends 42% of its exports (as compared to 6.5% going to Russia, 8.8% to Latvia, and 4.7% to Lithuania). On the other hand, the Estonian political system, its flat rate of income tax, and its non-welfare-state model distinguish it from the other Nordic states, and indeed from many other European countries.

Estonia is a party to 181 international organizations, including the BIS, CBSS, CE, EAPC, EBRD, ECE, EU (member since 1 May 2004), FAO, IAEA, IBRD, ICAO, ICRM, IFC, IFRCS, IHO, ILO, IMF, International Maritime Organization, Interpol, IOC, IOM (observer), ISO (correspondent), ITU, ITUC, NATO, OPCW, OSCE, PFP, UN, UNCTAD, UNESCO, UNMIBH, UNMIK, UNTSO, UPU, WCO, WEU (associate partner), WHO, WIPO, WMO, WTO.

International disputes

Territorial issues between Estonia and Russia

After the dissolution of the Soviet Union Estonia had hoped for the return of more than 2,000 square kilometers of territory annexed to Russia after World War II in 1945. The annexed land had been within the borders Estonia approved by Russia in the 1920 Tartu Peace Treaty. However, the Boris Yeltsin government disavowed any responsibility for acts committed by the Soviet Union.

After signing the border treaty by the corresponding foreign minister in 2005, it was ratified by the Estonian government and president. The Russian side interpreted the preamble as giving Estonia a possibility for future territorial claim, and Vladimir Putin notified Estonia that Russia will not consider these. Negotiations were reopened in 2012 and the Treaty was signed in February 2014. Ratification is still pending.

Diplomatic relations 
List of countries which Estonia maintains diplomatic relations with:

Bilateral relations

Africa

Americas

Asia

Europe

Oceania

See also
 List of diplomatic missions in Estonia
 List of diplomatic missions of Estonia
 List of ambassadors to Estonia
 List of envoys of Estonia
 Visa requirements for Estonian citizens

References